Emenista is a monotypic genus of Asian dwarf spiders containing the single species, Emenista bisinuosa. It was first described by Eugène Louis Simon in 1894, and has only been found in India.

See also
 List of Linyphiidae species (A–H)

References

Linyphiidae
Monotypic Araneomorphae genera
Spiders of the Indian subcontinent